Maarja Saulep (born 9 May 1991) is an Estonian footballer who plays as a forward for Flora and the Estonia women's national team.

Career
Prior to joining Flora, she played for Tammeka. She made her debut for the Estonia national team on 7 November 2019 against Belarus, coming on as a substitute for Signy Aarna.

References

External links

1991 births
Living people
Women's association football forwards
Estonian women's footballers
Estonia women's international footballers
FC Flora (women) players
Tartu JK Tammeka (women) players
Sportspeople from Kohtla-Järve